Selective perception is the tendency not to notice and more quickly forget stimuli that cause emotional discomfort and contradict our prior beliefs. For example, a teacher may have a favorite student because they are biased by in-group favoritism. The teacher ignores the student's poor attainment. Conversely, they might not notice the progress of their least favorite student.

Overview
Selective perception is the process by which individuals perceive what they want to in media messages while ignoring opposing viewpoints. It is a broad term to identify the behavior all people exhibit to tend to "see things" based on their particular frame of reference. It also describes how we categorize and interpret sensory information in a way that favors one category or interpretation over another. In other words, selective perception is a form of bias because we interpret information in a way that is congruent with our existing values and beliefs. Psychologists believe this process occurs automatically.

Selective perception may refer to any number of cognitive biases in psychology related to the way expectations affect perception. Human judgment and decision making is distorted by an array of cognitive, perceptual and motivational biases, and people tend not to recognise their own bias, though they tend to easily recognise (and even overestimate) the operation of bias in human judgment by others. One of the reasons this might occur might be because people are simply bombarded with too much stimuli every day to pay equal attention to everything, therefore, they pick and choose according to their own needs.

To understand when and why a particular region of a scene is selected, studies observed and described the eye movements of individuals as they go about performing specific tasks. In this case, vision was an active process that integrated scene properties with specific, goal-oriented oculomotor behaviour.

Several other studies have shown that students who were told they were consuming alcoholic beverages (which in fact were non-alcoholic) perceived themselves as being "drunk", exhibited fewer physiological symptoms of social stress, and drove a simulated car similarly to other subjects who had actually consumed alcohol. The result is somewhat similar to the placebo effect.

In one classic study on this subject related to the hostile media effect (which is itself an example of selective perception), viewers watched a filmstrip of a particularly violent Princeton-Dartmouth American football game. Princeton viewers reported seeing nearly twice as many rule infractions committed by the Dartmouth team than did Dartmouth viewers. One Dartmouth alumnus did not see any infractions committed by the Dartmouth side and erroneously assumed he had been sent only part of the film, sending word requesting the rest.

Selective perception is also an issue for advertisers, as consumers may engage with some ads and not others based on their pre-existing beliefs about the brand.

Seymour Smith, a prominent advertising researcher, found evidence for selective perception in advertising research in the early 1960s, and he defined it to be "a procedure by which people let in, or screen out, advertising material they have an opportunity to see or hear. They do so because of their attitudes, beliefs, usage preferences and habits, conditioning, etc." People who like, buy, or are considering buying a brand are more likely to notice advertising than are those who are neutral toward the brand. This fact has repercussions within the field of advertising research because any post-advertising analysis that examines the differences in attitudes or buying behavior among those aware versus those unaware of advertising is flawed unless pre-existing differences are controlled for. Advertising research methods that utilize a longitudinal design are arguably better equipped to control for selective perception.

Selective perceptions are of two types:
 Low level – Perceptual vigilance
 High level – Perceptual defense

See also 

 Confirmation bias
 List of cognitive biases
 Selective attention
 Selective retention

 Cognitive dissonance

 Selection bias

References

Cognitive biases